Now That's What I Call 80s Dance or Now 80s Dance is a triple-disc compilation album which was released in the United Kingdom on 14 October 2013. It includes nearly 60 of the biggest dance anthems of the 1980s era.

Track listing

CD 1
Black Box – Ride On Time
S'Express – Theme from S-Express
Yazz & The Plastic Population – The Only Way Is Up
MARRS – Pump Up The Volume
Technotronic – Pump Up the Jam
Coldcut featuring Lisa Stansfield – People Hold On
Steve "Silk" Hurley – Jack Your Body
Miami Sound Machine – Doctor Beat
Beatmasters featuring Betty Boo – Hey DJ / I Can't Dance To That Music You're Playing
Farley Jackmaster Funk & Jesse Saunders featuring Darryl Pandy – Love Can't Turn Around
Bomb the Bass – Beat Dis
Coldcut featuring Yazz & The Plastic Population – Doctorin' the House
Mantronix – Got to Have Your Love
Afrika Bambaataa & The Soulsonic Force – Don't Stop... Planet Rock
Malcolm McLaren – Double Dutch
Rock Steady Crew – (Hey You) The Rock Steady Crew
Salt-N-Pepa – Push It
Neneh Cherry – Buffalo Stance
Stakker – Stakker Humanoid
D-Mob featuring Gary Haisman – We Call It Acieed

CD 2
Frankie Goes to Hollywood – Relax
Soft Cell – Tainted Love
Heaven 17 – Temptation
Spandau Ballet – Chant No. 1 (I Don't Need This Pressure On)
The Human League – Love Action (I Believe in Love)
Dead Or Alive – You Spin Me Round (Like a Record)
Erasure – A Little Respect
Communards & Sarah Jane Morris – Don't Leave Me This Way
Wham! – Wake Me Up Before You Go-Go
Rick Astley – Never Gonna Give You Up
Blondie – Rapture
Grace Jones – Pull Up to the Bumper
Kid Creole and the Coconuts – Annie, I'm Not Your Daddy
The Weather Girls – It's Raining Men
Was (Not Was) – Walk the Dinosaur
Kylie Minogue – The Loco-Motion
Mel & Kim – Respectable
Kelly Marie – Feels Like I'm in Love
Sinitta – So Macho
Taylor Dayne – Tell It to My Heart

CD 3
Soul II Soul – Back to Life (However Do You Want Me)
Inner City – Good Life
Womack & Womack – Teardrops
Chaka Khan – I Feel for You
Bobby Brown – My Prerogative
Cameo – Word Up!
Freeez – I.O.U
Colonel Abrams – Trapped
Gwen Guthrie – Ain't Nothin' Goin' on But the Rent
Luther Vandross – Never Too Much
Alexander O'Neal – Criticize
Deniece Williams – Let's Hear It For The Boy
Jermaine Jackson – Let's Get Serious
Earth, Wind & Fire – Let's Groove
Odyssey – Use It Up and Wear It Out
The Pasadenas – Tribute (Right On)
Terence Trent D'Arby – Dance Little Sister
Paula Abdul – Straight Up
Indeep – Last Night a D.J. Saved My Life

Charts

Release history

References

External links 
 "Now That's What I Call 80s Dance"
 "Now 80s Dance full track listing"
Spotify Playlist

2013 compilation albums
80s Dance
Sony Music compilation albums
EMI Records compilation albums
Universal Music Group compilation albums
Warner Music Group compilation albums